The Bear and the Dragon is a techno-thriller novel, written by Tom Clancy and released on August 21, 2000. A direct sequel to Executive Orders (1996), President Jack Ryan deals with a war between Russia and China, referred respectively in the title as the Russian Bear and the Chinese Dragon. At over 1,028 pages, it is Clancy's longest novel. The book debuted at number one on The New York Times Best Seller list.

Plot summary 
In Moscow, SVR director Sergey Golovko survives an attack on his way to work, when a car identical to the armored white Mercedes that he was in was shot with an RPG-7, killing the occupants (one of them a former KGB agent turned pimp) inside. Investigation of the incident by Russian police and later intelligence officers points out to involvement from Chinese intelligence, and that Golovko was the real target. After the failed attempt on the SVR director's life, the Chinese later plot to assassinate the Russian president, but their agent, also a former KGB officer, was arrested by the FSB.

Meanwhile, U.S. President Jack Ryan gives Taiwan diplomatic status, which is implied as retaliation to China for secretly assisting in previous plots by Japan (Debt of Honor) and Iran (Executive Orders) against the U.S. Months later, during trade negotiations between the U.S. and China in Beijing, a CNN crew witnesses the murders of the Papal Nuncio to the country and a Chinese Baptist minister, when the two attempt to stop Chinese authorities from performing a forced abortion on one of the latter's followers.  Two days later, police officers brutally break up a prayer service led by the Baptist minister's widow in their home, who had been outraged that her husband's body was cremated and dumped into a river without her permission. International outrage over the incidents leads to a boycott on Chinese-made products. With its economy already struggling due to recent military expansions, the country hastens its planned invasion of Siberia to access newly discovered oil and gold fields.

Ryan persuades NATO to admit Russia, and promises assistance against China to the Russian president. When the Chinese enter Siberia, the Russians repel their invasion force with help from the United States, causing heavy casualties on the Chinese side. The U.S. Navy attacks the Chinese mainland's coastal defenses and destroys much of the Chinese navy's aging fleet while it lies in port. F-117 Nighthawks destroy railroad bridges in Harbin and Bei'an with GBU-27 Paveway IIIs, seriously damaging Chinese lines of communication for their army in Russia. Ryan later decides to broadcast CNN's coverage of the war, plus direct feeds from U.S. reconnaissance drones, over a CIA website to counter the Chinese government's propaganda about the war's status and purpose.

Beijing's increasingly desperate leaders decide to ready their ICBMs for a potential launch. A joint NATO-Russian special operations team led by Rainbow operative John Clark is dispatched to destroy them. The team destroys all but two of the Chinese missiles. Of the two that launch, one is shot down by an AH-64 Apache while the second heads toward Washington, D.C. Ryan's family is evacuated, but Ryan himself decides at the last minute to stay behind on board a docked naval ship, the USS Gettysburg, which is equipped with the experimental Aegis Ballistic Missile Defense System. Ryan watches as the ship destroys the ICBM at the last possible moment. News footage of the ICBM's interception was later streamed through the CIA website.

Meanwhile, in Beijing, a group of Chinese students, spurred on by what they have witnessed through the CIA website, march through Tiananmen Square and invade a Politburo meeting, setting the stage for an overthrow of the government. A reformist Politburo member, Fang Gan, takes over and arrests the rest of the Communist leadership, ordering an immediate withdrawal of Chinese forces from Siberia. Fang then holds an open discussion with student leaders that starts China's transition to democracy. The country then orders a unilateral ceasefire from the war with Russia.

Characters

The United States government
 Jack Ryan: President of the United States
 Robby Jackson: Vice President of the United States
 Scott Adler: Secretary of state
 Tony Bretano: Secretary of defense
 Arnie van Damm: President Ryan's chief of staff
 George Winston: Secretary of the treasury
 Ben Goodley: National Security Advisor to President Ryan
 Cliff Rutledge II: Assistant secretary of state for policy

The Central Intelligence Agency
 Ed Foley: Director of Central Intelligence
 Mary Pat Foley: Deputy Director (Operations)
 Chester "Chet" Nomuri: CIA field officer working in China, covered as an electronics salesman

The United States military
 Admiral Bart Mancuso: Commander in chief of the Pacific Fleet (CINCPAC)
 Major General Marion Diggs: Commander of the 1st Armored Division
 Dick Boyle: Commander of the Aviation Brigade attached to 1st Armored Division
 Bronco Winters: United States Air Force captain and F-15C pilot
 General Mickey Moore: Chairman of the Joint Chiefs of Staff

Rainbow
 John Clark: Commander of Rainbow
 Domingo "Ding" Chavez: Squad leader of Team 2
 Ettore "Hector" Falcone: Team 2 member, former Italian Carabinieri officer

Russia
 Sergey Golovko: Chairman of the Russian Foreign Intelligence Service (SVR)
 Gennady Bondarenko: Commander in chief of armed forces in the Far East
 Eduard Grushavoy: President of Russia
 Yuri Kirillin: Chief of Russian special forces, or Spetsnaz
 Oleg Provalov: Police officer based in Moscow
 Klementi Ivanovich Suvorov (Ivan Yurievich Koniev): Former Committee for State Security (KGB) lieutenant colonel hired by the Chinese to assassinate Golovko and later Grushavoy
 Gregoriy Avseyenko (Rasputin): Former KGB agent turned pimp who was killed by an RPG attack meant for Golovko
 Pavel Petrovich Gogol: Former sniper in the Red Army during World War II

China
 Fang Gan: Minister without portfolio
 Zhang Han San: Minister without portfolio
 Xu Kun Piao: General Secretary of the Chinese Communist Party
 Luo Cong: Defense minister and head of the People's Liberation Army
 Peng Xi-Wang: Commander of the Red Banner 34th Shock Army
 Yu Fa An: Baptist minister of Chinese descent
 Lian Ming: Secretary to Fang Gan and Nomura's asset (codename SONGBIRD) after unknowingly installing a program on her computer that downloads her superior's diary entries to the CIA
 Yang Lien-Hua: Yu Fa An's parishioner who had an unauthorized pregnancy

Other characters
 Cathy Ryan: First Lady of the United States
 Mark Gant: Secretary Winston's aide
 Alan Gregory: Junior vice president of TRW, later recruited by Secretary Bretano to investigate the feasibility of upgrading the Aegis Ballistic Missile Defense System to deal with Chinese intercontinental missiles (ICBMs)
 Mike Reilly: Federal Bureau of Investigation (FBI) agent assigned to Moscow, specializing in organized crime
 Renato Cardinal DiMilo: Papal Nuncio to China
 Reverend Gerry Patterson: Baptist pastor based in Jackson, Mississippi, Yu Fa An's friend
 Reverend Doctor Hosiah Jackson: Baptist minister and Vice President Jackson's father
 Barry Wise: CNN correspondent

Reception
The book received mixed reviews. While comparing it to Leo Tolstoy's novel War and Peace (1869), Entertainment Weekly praised the novel for its "excitingly cinematic climax", as well as for an abundance of African-American characters. Publishers Weekly noted "a handbook's worth of intoxicating, expertly researched, seemingly inside information". On the other hand, the book was criticized for its length, racist depiction of Chinese characters, and overreliance on right-wing politics. In a negative review, The Guardian bemoaned the length as "on full autopilot, and readers who haven't already quit from exhaustion might get the sneaking suspicion that the author too has long jumped ship", continuing: "Given [Clancy's] top-selling status, he has clearly progressed beyond any kind of editing."

References

2000 American novels
American thriller novels
Techno-thriller novels
Novels by Tom Clancy
Ryanverse
Novels set in Beijing
Novels set in China
Novels set in Russia
Novels set in Siberia
Novels set in Moscow
Novels set in Washington, D.C.
G. P. Putnam's Sons books
Novels about nuclear war and weapons